Mount Axford is a mountain in Fiordland National Park, New Zealand.  In 2021, the previously unnamed mountain was officially named after Sir William Ian Axford, a notable space scientist from New Zealand.  The mountain does not have a known original Māori name.

References

External links 
 Mount Axford at New Zealand Geographic Board Gazetteer

Fiordland National Park
Mountains of Southland, New Zealand